case/lang/veirs is the self-titled debut album by Canadian-American supergroup case/lang/veirs. The album was recorded in November 2015 and released June 17, 2016.

Reception

The group's self-titled debut album received "ecstatic reviews". Pitchfork reviewer Laura Snapes noted its strong musicianship and use of natural imagery. Snapes acknowledged comparisons to the 1987 album Trio from Dolly Parton, Linda Ronstadt, and Emmylou Harris, but said that unlike Trio it was unlikely to be followed up with a second album, and lang herself called it a "one-off record". Writing for Exclaim!, Sarah Greene lauded the album, calling it "profound, passionate and substantial." Andy Gill at The Independent called it "an album of rare beauty and intelligence" also noting "elemental reflections" in some of the lyrics. Production by Tucker Martine, Veirs's spouse, was lauded by Greg Kot of the Chicago Tribune as "[giving] each song exactly what it needs", also noting the singers attained an "organic feel to the union that would raise it above the usually mediocre (or worse) level of most such hey-let's-get-together-and-jam all-star collaborations".

Track listing
 "Atomic Number" (Laura Veirs/k.d. lang/Neko Case) – 2:58
 "Honey and Smoke" (Veirs/lang) – 3:04
 "Song for Judee" (Veirs) – 3:12
 "Blue Fires" (Veirs/lang) – 2:58
 "Delirium" (Veirs/lang/Case) – 2:46
 "Greens of June" (Veirs) – 4:13
 "Behind the Armory" (Veirs/lang/Case) – 2:20
 "Best Kept Secret" (Veirs) – 3:17
 "1000 Miles Away" (Veirs) – 2:57
 "Supermoon" (Veirs/Case) – 3:48
 "I Want to Be Here" (Veirs/lang/Case) – 2:47
 "Down I-5" (Veirs/Case) – 3:02
 "Why Do We Fight" (Veirs/lang) – 2:36
 "Georgia Stars" (Veirs/lang) – 3:17

Personnel
Musicians
Rob Burger – keys, piano, claviola
Neko Case – vocals
Glenn Kotche – drums, percussion
k.d. lang – vocals, acoustic guitar (13)
Sebastian Steinberg – electric/upright bass, autoharp
Laura Veirs – vocals, guitars
Tim Young – lead/rhythm guitar

Guest musicians
Ralph Carney – horns (8)
Michael Finn – additional keys (1), additional guitar (4, 13)
Jon Hyde – pedal steel (13)
Tucker Martine – percussion, drums (13)
Anna Fritz (cello), Kyleen King (viola), Patti King (violin) – strings (3, 4, 5, 8)
Strings on 1, 6, 10 arranged by Stephen Barber and performed by Tosca String Quartet (Leigh Mahoney, Tracy Seeger, Ames Asbell, Sara Nelson)

Charts

References

2016 debut albums
Anti- (record label) albums
Case/lang/veirs albums